United Coal Company (UCC), a coal mining company headquartered in Blountville, Tennessee, is a producer of high grade metallurgical coals.  It has operations in Virginia, West Virginia, Kentucky, and Tennessee.

History

Foundation
In 1970, Jim McGlothlin (a legal resident of Naples, Florida), along with his father Woodrow W. McGlothlin (who started the Diamond Smokeless Coal Co. in the mid-1950s) and five other investors, founded United Coal Company in Grundy, Virginia. McGlothlin first sold UCC in 1997 and later repurchased the company in 2004. The McGlothlins also founded The McGlothlin Foundation, which funds a variety of education-related causes in Southwest Virginia and The United Company Charitable Foundation.

Ownership changes
In 2006, former King Pharmaceuticals executives John M. Gregory and Joseph "Joe" Gregory invested in the company. The Gregory brothers are its first investors outside the McGlothlin family.

During April, 2009 Ukrainian business group Metinvest, controlled by Rinat Akhmetov, purchased the company for an estimated $1 billion. In August 2009, United Coal Company moved into its new corporate headquarters at 110 Sprint Drive in Blountville, Tennessee. A staff of thirty four employees work out of the Blountville UCC office, which combines all corporate activities and executives in one location, including legal counsel, risk management, accounting, purchasing, information technology, human resources and sales – departments previously located in Teays Valley, West Virginia, and Bristol, Virginia.

Holdings
Carter Roag Coal Company
Sapphire Coal Company
Pocahontas Coal Company
Wellmore Coal Company

See also
Fischer–Tropsch process
Massey Energy
Mountain Party
Mountaintop removal mining
United Mine Workers

References

Eastern Coal Council.  August 15, 2006 newsletter.
U.K. National Union of Mineworkers. "Coal Conference Speakers Say End Dependence On Foreign Oil".

External links
United Management Company, LLC. "About United Management Company".
United Coal Company webpage
Eastern Coal Council
SJ Investments, Officers - John M. Gregory
Metinvest

SCM Holdings
Coal companies of the United States
Bristol, Virginia
1970 establishments in Virginia